The 1870 Atlantic hurricane season lasted from mid-summer to late-fall and comprised one tropical storm and ten hurricanes, two of which became major hurricanes, (Category 3+). However, in the absence of modern satellite and other remote-sensing technologies, only storms that affected populated land areas or encountered ships at sea were recorded, so the actual total could be higher. An undercount bias of zero to six tropical cyclones per year between 1851 and 1885 and zero to four per year between 1886 and 1910 has been estimated.

 

Season summary 
The Atlantic hurricane database (HURDAT) recognizes eleven tropical cyclones for the 1870 season. Ten storms attained hurricane status, with winds of 75 mph (119 km/h) or greater. Of the eleven Atlantic cyclones known for 1870 only three made landfall. Although Hurricane One caused damage in Alabama, the storm centre may not have crossed the coastline. Hurricane Nine made landfalls in both Cuba and Florida. Hurricane Two and Tropical Storm Three were both active in the first week of September but neither made landfall, although Hurricane Two did come close to the Newfoundland coastline. Later that month two more hurricanes were seen in the western Atlantic. Hurricane Four was an intense category three cyclone while Hurricane Five was a weaker category one storm. More notable was Hurricane Six. This hurricane, known as the Hurricane of San Marcos or the Straits of Florida Hurricane, caused massive flooding in Cuba and south Florida, resulting in 2,000 casualties and at least $12 million in damages. Hurricanes Seven and Eight were also active in the first half of October, both in the mid-Atlantic. Hurricane Nine made landfalls in both Cuba and Florida and was responsible for some 52 deaths. Hurricane Ten was sighted on October 23 near the Turks and Caicos Islands. The last cyclone of the year, Hurricane Eleven, made landfall in Belize.

Timeline

Systems

Hurricane One 

The Mobile Hurricane of 1870

The first officially recognized tropical cyclone of 1870 made landfall near Mobile, Alabama, on July 30, though little is known about its genesis or track. The storm's passage was brief, with the strongest winds confined to a period of about two hours in the early afternoon. Storm surge flooding damaged coastal installations along the shores of Mobile Bay, and several steamboats were either sunk or blown ashore. The winds uprooted trees, damaged roofs, and severed telegraph wires throughout Mobile. At the height of the storm, a floating dry dock broke free from its moorings and traveled about  up the Mobile River, crushing wharves and boats along its path. Overall, damage from the storm amounted to an estimated $200,000 (1870 USD).

Hurricane Two 

A tropical storm formed on August 30. The storm moved northwest towards the United States, before it peaked as a Category 2 hurricane. The storm then curved back to the northeast. It travelled parallel to the coast of Nova Scotia until it was last seen on September 4 near Newfoundland.

Tropical Storm Three 

A tropical storm was detected to the west of Cape Verde on September 1. Tracking westward, it was encountered by another ship on September 4. The storm's subsequent progress is unknown.

Hurricane Four 

There, the storm produced tropical storm-force winds that extensively damaged banana and other fruit trees. Curving northeastward, the hurricane underwent extratropical transition by September 13.

Hurricane Five 

Numerous ships in the western Atlantic reported stormy weather from September 17 through 20. By weighting these reports according to their credibility and consistency, Partagás was able to construct an approximate recurving track for the hurricane. As the system accelerated northeastward, it probably transitioned into an extratropical cyclone on September 19.

Hurricane Six 

First Key West Hurricane of 1870 or Hurricane of San Marcos of 1870

On October 5, a tropical storm developed south of Haiti. It moved west-northwest, becoming a hurricane south of Cuba on October 6. The hurricane rapidly strengthened to Category 3 with peak winds of  prior to hitting Matanzas, Cuba on October 7. After crossing Cuba, the hurricane moved slowly northeastward through the Florida Straits generating Category 1 winds over the Florida Keys. It moved out to sea, last being seen on October 14.

The combination of sustained high winds, intensive rainfall and two rivers, the San Juan and the Yumuri, bursting their banks destroyed the city and caused the loss of some 800 lives. 1,200 people died in Cuba; it was one of the deadliest hurricanes on record. Damage was estimated at over $12 million (USD).

Hurricane Seven 

On October 7, a ship, the Horatio Harris, reported a hurricane several hundred miles west of the Cape Verde Islands; this appears to be the only known record of the storm. Partagás considered that the system may have been related to the subsequent tropical cyclone over the northern Atlantic, but determined this to be unlikely, given the rapid speed at which it would have needed to travel.

Hurricane Eight 

A hurricane was first detected on October 10, more than 800 miles to the east of Bermuda. Based on reports from several ships, it headed east-northeastward over the following day. Little else is known about its track.

Hurricane Nine 

Second Key West Hurricane of 1870

On October 19 a hurricane was discovered in the Caribbean. The next day it made a landfall in western Cuba as a Category 2 hurricane, causing severe damage in Batabanó and Vuelta Abajo.
Later on the 20th, it made landfall in Florida as a Category 1 hurricane. The centre of the hurricane passed over the Dry Tortugas, producing heavy rainfall. It later hit Chokoloskee, crossed the state, and moved out to sea. It eventually dissipated on October 22. Hurricane Nine was responsible for 52 fatalities.

Hurricane Ten 

Several ships north of Cuba and Hispaniola reported a hurricane on October 23 and 24. No further details about this storm are known.

Hurricane Eleven 

The final storm of the season originated from an area of unsettled weather that began affecting ships in the western Caribbean Sea on October 27. It organized into a tropical cyclone several days later, and maritime reports suggest that it achieved minimal hurricane intensity. The hurricane probably curved northward and weakened upon reaching the mountainous terrain of the Yucatán Peninsula. On November 3, a ship encountered the storm at hurricane intensity in the southeastern Gulf of Mexico.

See also 

 Lists of hurricanes by area:
 Bermuda
 Canada
 Florida (pre-1900)
 Tropical cyclone observation
 Atlantic hurricane reanalysis project

References 
Specific

General

 
 
 
 

 
Atlantic Hurricane Season, 1870
Atlantic hurricane seasons
Articles which contain graphical timelines
Atlantic